The EMD SDL39 is a model of 6-axle diesel-electric locomotive built by General Motors Electro-Motive Division between March 1969 and November 1972. Power was provided by the EMD 645E3 12-cylinder engine as used in the EMD GP39 which generated 2,300 horsepower (1.7 MW).

All 10 examples of this locomotive model were built for Milwaukee Road, who wanted a lightweight road-switcher to replace their fleet of 1947-built ALCO RSC-2s.

These Milwaukee Road units were numbered 581–590. The 581 was wrecked at Sacred Heart, MN in 1983, and scrapped the following year. The remaining nine units were transferred to the Soo Line Railroad when it acquired the Milwaukee Road. All were subsequently included in the sale of the Soo's Lakes States Division (most of its network in Wisconsin and Upper Michigan, plus some lines in adjoining Illinois and Minnesota) to the new Wisconsin Central Limited. After the Wisconsin Central was purchased by, and merged into the Canadian National Railway, the nine units were returned to the lessor, and were sold to FEPASA, Chilean Freight Operation Concession.

References 

 
 Sarberenyi, Robert. EMD SD39 and SDL39 Original Owners.

External links 

SD39L
C-C locomotives
Milwaukee Road locomotives
Railway locomotives introduced in 1969
Diesel-electric locomotives of the United States
Freight locomotives
Standard gauge locomotives of the United States
5 ft 6 in gauge locomotives